Greenhithe railway station (also known as Greenhithe for Bluewater) serves the village of Greenhithe in north Kent and Bluewater Shopping Centre.

Train services are operated by Southeastern and Thameslink.

Design

Before Bluewater was built Greenhithe station was just a small village station. The only access between the entrance and the London-bound platform was via a subway with no disabled access.

The station was rebuilt in 2008 to improve accessibility for disabled users and upgrade the station and ticketing facilities.

The subway has been replaced by a bridge with stairs and lift access at both ends. The new station entrance and booking hall lies directly between the bridge and the bus stop outside (see Fastrack below). Before the construction of this stop and its access road, buses had to stop some distance away downhill and passengers had to transfer via stairs and a footpath.

Services

The typical off-peak service in trains per hour is:
 2 tph to London Charing Cross via 
 2 tph to London Cannon Street via  and 
 2 tph to  via Woolwich Arsenal and 
 2 tph to  via 

Connections

The station is served by a bus station from which frequent buses run to surrounding destinations. 

The station is served by the Fastrack routes A, AZ and B which provide regular connections to Dartford, Temple Hill, Bluewater,  and Gravesend.

References

External links

Railway stations in Kent
DfT Category E stations
Transport in the Borough of Dartford
Former South Eastern Railway (UK) stations
Railway stations in Great Britain opened in 1849
Railway stations served by Southeastern
Railway station
1849 establishments in England
Railway stations served by Govia Thameslink Railway